Wu Xi (born 19 February 1989) is a Chinese professional footballer who currently plays for Chinese Super League club Shanghai Shenhua.

Club career
Wu Xi started his football career with Hebei Tiangong in 2008 when the club was formed and joined the third tier. While the club only played one season in the division, Wu's development particularly with the Chinese national youth teams was impressive enough for top tier side Shanghai Shenhua to be interested in his services, signing for the club on 17 November 2009. At the start of the 2010 season, Wu would make his debut for the club on 3 April 2010 in a 2-1 win against Nanchang Bayi. He scored his first goal for the club on 17 April 2010 in a 2-0 win against Tianjin Teda.

Before the start of the 2013 season, Wu transferred to fellow Chinese Super League side Jiangsu Suning. He made his debut for the club on 26 February 2013 in a 5-1 loss against FC Seoul in the 2013 AFC Champions League. He would go on to establish himself as a regular within the team and go on to win the 2015 Chinese FA Cup against Shanghai Shenhua. This would be followed by the 2020 Chinese Super League title when he would win the clubs first league title with them.

International career
Wu was first called up to the Chinese under-19 national team in 2007 and took part in the 2008 AFC U-19 Championship. A regular with the side, he could only aid the team to the quarter-finals after he personally missed a penalty in a penalty shootout against Uzbekistan. After the tournament, he would move up to the Chinese under-23 national team and then to the senior squad when he made his debut for then manager Gao Hongbo's last squad on 28 September 2011 in a 6-1 win against Laos during 2014 FIFA World Cup qualification.

On 24 December 2014, Wu was named in China's squad for the 2015 AFC Asian Cup in Australia. In the team's second group match, he scored the equalizing goal as China won 2-1 against Uzbekistan to qualify for the knockout stage.

Career statistics

Club statistics
.

International statistics

International goals

Scores and results list China's goal tally first.

Honours

Club
Jiangsu Suning
Chinese Super League: 2020
Chinese FA Cup: 2015
Chinese FA Super Cup: 2013

Individual
Chinese Super League Team of the Year: 2015, 2016, 2019

References

External links
 
 
 Player profile at Shanghai Shenhua website
 Player stats at Sohu.com

1989 births
Living people
Sportspeople from Shijiazhuang
Chinese footballers
Footballers from Hebei
China international footballers
Shanghai Shenhua F.C. players
Jiangsu F.C. players
Chinese Super League players
China League Two players
2015 AFC Asian Cup players
2019 AFC Asian Cup players
Footballers at the 2010 Asian Games
Association football midfielders
Asian Games competitors for China